Ulrich Matthes (born 9 May 1959) is a German actor, possibly best-known for having played Joseph Goebbels in the 2004 film Downfall.

Life and work

Matthes was born in West Berlin and educated at the Evangelisches Gymnasium zum Grauen Kloster. He studied acting in the early 1980s in Berlin under Else Bongers. In the 2004 movie Downfall he plays Joseph Goebbels. In the 2004 movie The Ninth Day, he plays Fr. Henri Kremer, a Catholic priest imprisoned at Dachau. He is also the standard German voice for Kenneth Branagh along with Martin Umbach. In February 2021, Matthes came out as gay.

Awards
 1985: Förderpreis für Literatur der Landeshauptstadt Düsseldorf in Northrhine-Westphalia
 1999: Bavarian Film Award – Best Actor for performance in Rider of the Flames
 2003: Deutscher Hörbuchpreis
 2007: Theaterpreis Berlin
 2008: Deutscher Theaterpreis Der Faust
 2015: Goldene Kamera – Best German Actor for performances in the Tatort episode Im Schmerz geboren (“Born in pain”) and in Bornholmer Straße (“Bornholm street”) 
 2015: Grimme-Preis – Best Actor for performance in Tatort: Im Schmerz geboren
 2015: German Television Academy Award – Best Actor for performance in Bornholmer Straße
 2016: Lielais Kristaps – Best Actor for performance in Pelnu Sanitorija (Exiled)
 2022 Officer's Cross of the Order of Merit of the Federal Republic of Germany

Film

1969: An einem Tag im September (Short) – Max
1970: Die Wesenacks (TV film) – Fränzchen 
1973: Artur, Peter und der Eskimo (TV film) – Peter
1989: Henry V – Henry V (German version)
1992: Herr Ober! – TV game show host
1994: Mary Shelley's Frankenstein – Victor Frankenstein (German version)
1995: Ein falscher Schritt (TV film) – Georg Klein
1995: Der Mörder und sein Kind (TV film) – Rainer Dreyer
1995: Nikolaikirche (TV film) – Alexander ‘Sascha’ Bacher
1995: Othello – Iago (German version)
1996: Hamlet – Prince Hamlet (German version)
1997:  (TV film) – Jan-Carl Raspe
1997: Winter Sleepers – Rene
1998: Abgehauen (TV film) – Eberhard E.
1998: Rider of the Flames – Baron Isaac von Sinclair
1999: Aimée & Jaguar – Eckert (SS)
1999: Framed (Short) – Beck
2000: The Coq Is Dead (TV film) – Kommissar Steiner
2002: Mörderherz (TV film) – Dr. Graf
2004:  – Peter
2004: The Ninth Day – Abbé Henri Kremer
2004: Downfall – Joseph Goebbels
2006: Wer war Kafka? (Documentary) (voice)
2006: Vineta – Dr. Leonhard
2008:  – Robert von der Mühlen
2010:  (TV film) – Hauptmann
2011: Cracks in the Shell – Ben Kästner
2011: Calm at Sea (TV film) – Ernst Jünger
2012: A Little Suicide (Short) – The Cockroach (voice)
2012: Kunduz: The Incident at Hadji Ghafur – Grewe
2013: The Notebook – Apa
2014:  (TV film) – Hartmut Kummer
2016: Pelnu Sanitorija (Exiled) (Latvian film) – Ulrihs
2016: Geschichte einer Liebe – Freya – Helmuth James von Moltke
2016: Die Vierte Gewalt (TV film) – Publisher
2017: Gift (TV film) – Matteo Kälin
2017: Krieg (TV film) – Arnold
2017: Die Puppenspieler (TV film) – Rodrigo Borgia
2019: A Hidden Life – Lorenz Schwaninger
2021: The Story of My Wife – the psychiatrist
2022: Munich - The Edge of War – Adolf Hitler

Television
1995: Wolffs Revier: Sommersprossen – Danzer
1987–1997: Derrick (4 episodes) – Harald Breuer / Robert Lohmann / Holger Küster / Ulrich Huberti
1997: The Old Fox: Der Tod der Eltern – Andreas Gobel
1997–1999: Polizeiruf 110 (2 episodes) – Psychologe / Tanjas Partner
2000: Ein Fall für zwei: Blutiges Pfand – Michael Strobel
2008: The Bill: Proof of Life – Victor Hauptmann (crossover story with Leipzig Homicide)
2011: Tatort:  – Günther Kremer
2014: Tatort:  – Richard Harloff
2019: Sarah Kohr: Das verschwundene Mädchen – Artem Lasarew
2020: Das Boot

References

External links
 

1959 births
Living people
20th-century German male actors
21st-century German male actors
Crystal Simorgh recipients
German gay actors
German male film actors
German male television actors
Lielais Kristaps Award winners
Male actors from Berlin
Members of the Academy of Arts, Berlin